Hemiculterella wui is a species of cyprinid in the genus Hemiculterella. It inhabits the Zhujiang (also called the Pearl River) and Qiantang rivers of China.

References

Cyprinidae
Cyprinid fish of Asia
Freshwater fish of China